Nagybörzsöny ( or ) is a village in Pest County, Hungary.

Location 
Nagybörzsöny is a village in the Börzsöny Mountains. It is near the National Park of Duna-Ipoly. The Börzsöny-creek flows through the village.

History 
The earlier name of this village was Börzsöny and it was, in all probability, founded in the 12th century by King Géza II of Hungary.  In medieval times, it was able to grow into a full-fledged mining town due to its proximity to various ores, including gold.  Documents dating from 1312 already describe these mines.  However, the most significant part in the mines' history took place in the eighteenth century.  In 1789, Pál Kitaibel officially discovered the element Tellurium in the Nagybörzsöny ores.   Two other Hungarians were also noted for their research of the element.  In 1782, Franz-Joseph Müller von Reichenstein, otherwise known as (Müller Ferenc), independently named the element.  A third Hungarian who also laid claim to Tellurium was Ignaz von Born.  Muller was from Sibiu/Nagyszeben in what is now Transylvania, and von Born worked in Vienna.  In 1798, the new element was named by Martin Heinrich Klaproth; the name is derived from the Latin word "tellus", meaning earth.  Tellurium has thermoelectric applications, and was used in alloys within the steel industry.  The element eventually played an important role in the making of the outer shell of the first atom bomb.

Transport
It is the terminus of a narrow-gauge railway to Szob.

Sightseeings 
 The main attraction of the village is an architectural one: The Árpád age romanesque church Szent István-templom, built in the 13th century. The church is surrounded by walls. 
 Saint Nicolaus church
 Church of the miners. Gothic style, built in the 14th century
 Evangelic church classicist style, built in the 18th century
 Watermill: industrial memorial

References 

 Aradi N. (Ed.): A művészet története Magyarországon. (The History of Arts in Hungary). Gondolat, Budapest 
 Fülep L. (Ed.): A magyarországi művészet története. (The History of the Hungarian Arts). Budapest 
 Gerevich T.: Magyarország románkori emlékei. (Die romanische Denkmäler Ungarns.) Egyetemi nyomda. Budapest, 1938.
 Gerő L. : Magyar műemléki ABC. Budapest, 1984
 Henszlmann, I. (1876): Magyarország ó-keresztyén, román és átmeneti stylü mű-emlékeinek rövid ismertetése, (Old-Christian, Romanesque and Transitional Style Architecture in Hungary). Királyi Magyar Egyetemi Nyomda, Budapest
 Marosi E.: A román kor művészete, (Art of the Romanesque Ages). Corvina, Budapest, 1972,

Gallery

External links 

 Homepage of Nagybörzsöny village
 Homepage of the village
 Aerial images of Nagybörzsöny
 Photos of Nagybörzsöny

Populated places in Pest County
Romanesque architecture in Hungary
Hungarian German communities